Supratiṣṭhitacāritra (also known as Firm Practice), is one of the four great  perfected bodhisattvas mentioned in the 15th chapter of the Lotus Sutra. He is believed to represent the "bliss" characteristic of Buddhahood, which is the liberation from suffering.

Notes

References 
 McCormick, Ryuei M. "The Bodhisattvas of the Earth" Nichirenscoffeehouse.net. Nichiren's Coffeehouse and Gohonzon Gallery, 2002. Web. 17 May 2011.
 

Bodhisattvas
Nichiren Buddhism
Lotus Sutra